Hamilton Centre is a provincial electoral district in Ontario, Canada, that is represented in the Legislative Assembly of Ontario.

It was created for the 1926 provincial election but abolished with the 1999 provincial election when the number of constituencies represented in the legislature was reduced. It was re-created for the 2007 election from parts of Hamilton East, Hamilton West ridings.

It consists of the part of the City of Hamilton bounded by a line drawn south from the city limit along Kenilworth Avenue, west along the Niagara Escarpment, northeast along Highway No. 403, east along the Desjardins Canal to Hamilton Harbour.

Members of Provincial Parliament

Election results

Hamilton Centre, 2007–present

 

^ Results are compared to redistributed results

Hamilton Centre, 1926–1999

2007 electoral reform referendum

References

External links
Elections Ontario Past Election Results
Map of riding for 2018 election

Ontario provincial electoral districts
Politics of Hamilton, Ontario